Cylindropuntia echinocarpa is a species of cactus known by the common names silver cholla, golden cholla, and Wiggins' cholla. It was formerly named Opuntia echinocarpa.

Distribution and habitat
Cylindropuntia echinocarpa is native to the Southwestern United States and Northwestern Mexico, where it can be found the Sonoran Desert, the Mojave Desert, and Colorado Desert in California and other states.

It commonly occurs in desert dry wash, creosote bush scrub, Joshua tree woodland, and pinyon-juniper woodland communities. It ranges from Mono County to Baja California Peninsula.

Description
Silver cholla is a large, tree-like cactus which may exceed  in height. Its stems and branches are made up of cylindrical green tubercles (segments) up to 1.5 cm wide and just under 1.0 cm tall. The fleshy tubercles each bear up to 20 long, straight, grayish or yellowish spines which may be nearly 4 cm long. The width of the tubercles is less than twice the length, which helps to distinguish it from buckhorn cholla (Cylindropuntia acanthocarpa), which occurs in a similar geographical distribution.

The flowers are usually greenish yellow, sometimes pinkish or brownish in color. The fruit is lumpy, spiny, and tan in color, with white seeds and a foul scent, reminiscent of rancid butter. It measures up to two centimeters long. Very few fruits reach maturity, and many immature fruits can often be seen lying on the ground below. This plant reproduces mainly through seeds, but its tubercles may break off and have a chance of producing new plants through asexual reproduction.

References

External links

Cylindropuntia echinocarpa photo gallery at Opuntia Web
Jepson Manual Treatment — Cylindropuntia echinocarpa
Flora of North America
Cylindropuntia echinocarpa Photo gallery

echinocarpa
Cacti of the United States
Cacti of Mexico
Flora of the California desert regions
Flora of the Sonoran Deserts
Flora of the Southwestern United States
Flora of Northwestern Mexico
Flora of Arizona
Flora of Baja California
Flora of Nevada
Flora of Sonora
Flora of Utah
Natural history of the Mojave Desert
Natural history of the Colorado Desert
North American desert flora